Herana-Daze Lavalle Jones (first name pronounced like 'Hernandez') (born April 15, 1982) is a former American football safety. He was signed by the Cincinnati Bengals as an undrafted free agent in 2005. He played college football at Indiana.

Jones was also a member of the Denver Broncos, New England Patriots, New Orleans Saints and Arizona Cardinals.

Early years
Jones attended Iroquois High School in Louisville, Kentucky where, as a senior, he scored 26 touchdowns and broke the state record with a 220 yards per game rushing average, previously held by Shaun Alexander. Jones also lettered in track and basketball.

College career
Jones played college football at Indiana, where he was a four-year starter.  He currently ranks 4th  All-time in tackles at Indiana with 342.  As a senior, he led the team in tackles with 110, making 2nd team all big ten.

Professional career

Cincinnati Bengals
Jones was signed by the Cincinnati Bengals as a college free agent on April 28, 2005. After spending the 2005 season on the Bengals' practice squad, he made the 53-man roster in 2006. Jones led the Bengals in special teams tackles in both 2006 and 2007. He was placed on injured reserve on October 17, 2008, and released from injured reserve with an injury settlement on November 4, 2008.

Denver Broncos
Jones signed with the Denver Broncos on December 3, 2008. He was waived on December 10 when the team re-signed tight end Jeb Putzier. He was re-signed by the Broncos on December 16 when running back Cory Boyd was waived. He was released again on June 18, 2009.

New England Patriots
Jones signed with the New England Patriots on July 28, 2009. He was released by the Patriots during final cuts on September 5.

New Orleans Saints
Jones signed with the New Orleans Saints on December 22, 2009, when the team waived cornerback Marcus McCauley. He was waived on December 29 as the team re-signed tight end Tory Humphrey.

Arizona Cardinals
Jones signed a future contract with the Arizona Cardinals on January 21, 2010.

External links
Official website
New England Patriots bio
Denver Broncos bio

1982 births
Living people
Players of American football from Louisville, Kentucky
American football safeties
Indiana Hoosiers football players
Cincinnati Bengals players
Denver Broncos players
New England Patriots players
New Orleans Saints players
Arizona Cardinals players
Florida Tuskers players
Iroquois High School alumni